XMU may refer to:
libxmu, a library for programming on the X Window System
Moulins - Montbeugny Airport, an airport in France with IATA code XMU.
Sirius XMU, a radio channel on Sirius XM Radio which plays unsigned artists.
Xiamen University in China
Xinjiang Medical University in China